Aeromonas eucrenophila is a Gram-negative bacterium of the genus Aeromonas isolated from fresh water and infected fish. A. eucrenophila is a pathogen of fish, and it causes diarrhoea in humans.

References

External links
Type strain of Aeromonas eucrenophila at BacDive -  the Bacterial Diversity Metadatabase

Aeromonadales
Bacteria described in 1988